Holton is a village (or hamlet) and parish in Somerset, England, situated on the A303 road  south west of Wincanton in the South Somerset district.  The village has a population of 238.

History
The parish of Holton was part of the Whitley Hundred.

The route of the A303 has been changed a couple of times.  The oldest route passes through the centre of the village past the Old Inn, and is a narrow lane.  The village was bypassed by a new route a hundred yards to the north, and has since been bypassed again by the creation of a dual carriageway a few yards further north.  To reach Holton it is necessary to leave the modern A303 at Wincanton (2 miles to the east) or, if arriving from the west, leave at Blackford (1 mile to the west), then join the older route.

Governance
The parish council has responsibility for local issues, including setting an annual precept (local rate) to cover the council’s operating costs and producing annual accounts for public scrutiny. The parish council evaluates local planning applications and works with the local police, district council officers, and neighbourhood watch groups on matters of crime, security, and traffic. The parish council's role also includes initiating projects for the maintenance and repair of parish facilities, as well as consulting with the district council on the maintenance, repair, and improvement of highways, drainage, footpaths, public transport, and street cleaning. Conservation matters (including trees and listed buildings) and environmental issues are also the responsibility of the council.

The village falls within the Non-metropolitan district of South Somerset, which was formed on 1 April 1974 under the Local Government Act 1972, having previously been part of Wincanton Rural District. The district council is responsible for local planning and building control, local roads, council housing, environmental health, markets and fairs, refuse collection and recycling, cemeteries and crematoria, leisure services, parks, and tourism.

Somerset County Council is responsible for running the largest and most expensive local services such as education, social services, libraries, main roads, public transport, policing and  fire services, trading standards, waste disposal and strategic planning.

It is also part of the Somerton and Frome county constituency represented in the House of Commons of the Parliament of the United Kingdom. It elects one Member of Parliament (MP) by the first past the post system of election.

Religious sites
The parish Church of St Nicholas dates from the 14th century and has been designated as a Grade II* listed building.

References

External links

Villages in South Somerset
Civil parishes in Somerset